Ballophilus tercrux is a species of centipede in the genus Ballophilus. It is found on the island of Sumba.

References 

Ballophilidae
Animals described in 1972